The Endless Road is a 1943 German biographical film directed by Hans Schweikart and starring Eugen Klöpfer, Eva Immermann and Hedwig Wangel. It portrays the life of Friedrich List, a German who emigrated to the United States in the nineteenth century. Unusually the film was overtly pro-American at a time when the two countries were at war. This was possibly because the Nazi leadership hoped to shortly join the Americans in an anti-Soviet alliance and wanted to encourage warmer feelings between the two nations. Another pro-American (and anti-British) film about Thomas Paine was planned, but never made.

It was made by Bavaria Film, one of the four major German film companies of the era. The film's sets were designed by the art director Hans Sohnle.

Cast

References

Bibliography

External links 
 

1943 films
1940s historical films
1940s biographical films
German historical films
German biographical films
Films of Nazi Germany
1940s German-language films
Films directed by Hans Schweikart
Films with screenplays by Ernst von Salomon
German black-and-white films
Films based on Austrian novels
Films set in the 1820s
Films set in the 1830s
Films set in the 1840s
Films set in the United States
Cultural depictions of Andrew Jackson
Cultural depictions of Klemens von Metternich
Bavaria Film films
Films set in the Kingdom of Württemberg
1940s German films